Kassande is a town in the Sidéradougou Department of Comoé Province in south-western Burkina Faso. The town has a population of 1,307.

References

External links
Satellite map at Maplandia.com

Populated places in the Cascades Region
Comoé Province